Oak Orchard State Marine Park is an  state park located at the mouth of Oak Orchard Creek at Lake Ontario in the Town of Carlton in Orleans County, New York, United States.  The park can be accessed from NY Route 18 and the Lake Ontario State Parkway.  The park is a few miles east of Lakeside Beach State Park.

The park offers picnic tables, a boat launch, and fishing.

See also
 List of New York state parks

References

External links
 New York State Parks: Oak Orchard State Marine Park

State parks of New York (state)
Marine parks of New York (state)
Parks in Orleans County, New York